The word Bracho can refer to:

Berakhah (Judaism), a blessing or benediction, usually recited according to a traditional formula
Bracho (surname), a Spanish surname